Badamasi: Portrait of a General is a biopic about former Nigerian head of state, Ibrahim Badamasi Babangida (IBB). It was directed by Obi Emelonye and stars Enyinna Nwigwe in the lead role as Babangida. It is the first Nollywood political biopic.

Plot
Badamasi tells the story of Babangida from his origins in the village of Wushishi in Northern Nigeria to his joining the army and time as a Nigerian military head of state. It also portrays significant events in Babangida's life including the period of the Nigerian civil war where Babangida sustains injuries in an attempt to rescue a colleague. The subsequent military coups and annulment of the June 1993 presidential elections were also portrayed.

Cast

 Enyinna Nwigwe  as Babangida
Charles Inojie 
Sani Danja 
Yakubu Mohammed 
Okey Bakassi 
Kalu Ikeagwu 
Julius Agwu 
Erick Didie

Production and release
Production for Badamasi commenced in 2017. The film is set in 1980/1990s Nigeria and was shot on location in Lagos, Minna, Abuja and the University of Nigeria (UNN), Nsukka. The film director told a Pulse Nigeria interviewer that it took him 4 years to convince Babangida to allow him make the biopic. The film was initially billed for a 29 November 2019 release date but was delayed due to reported "powerful people" who were against the circulation of the film. There were concerns that the biopic might be an attempt to whitewash Babangida's story as the annulment of the June 1993 presidential elections earned Babangida condemnation. The first look trailer was released in September 2019. Badamasi premiered at the Cineworld O2 Arena in South London on 12 June 2021.

Critical reception 
A reviewer for The Guardian praised the film for its production and attention to technical details noting that "It did not ‘feel’ like Nollywood" and was in keeping with Obi Emelonye's other films including Heart 2 Heart, The Mirror Boy, Last Flight to Abuja and Onye Ozi.

Awards and nominations

References

External links 

Nigerian drama films
English-language Nigerian films
Biographical films about presidents
2020s English-language films